The Abkhazians in Turkey refers to citizens  of Turkey who are ethnic Abkhazians originating from Abkhazia. In 2014, it was estimated that around 150,000 Abkhazians lived in Turkey of which 48,000 spoke Abkhaz.

Numbers

Notable Abkhaz Turks

Statesmans 
 Rauf Orbay (Abkhaz surname Ashkharua) - naval officer, statesman and diplomat.

Culture 
 Mihri Müşfik Hanım (abkhaz surname Achba) – one of the first and most renowned Turkish female painters. She was recognized especially for her portraits, including popular figures Mustafa Kemal Atatürk and Pope Benedict XV.
 Leyla Achba - abkhazian princess. She is known for writing memoirs, which give details of the sultan's court life and was the first Ottoman court lady to write memoirs.
 İbrahim Süreyya Yiğit – thinker, politician and antisemitic writer, who was directly involved in ratifying the Varlık Vergisi law.
 Keriman Halis Ece – beauty pageant titleholder, pianist, and fashion model who won the Miss Turkey 1932 title. She was also crowned Miss Universe 1932 in Spa, Belgium and thus became Turkey's first Miss Universe.

Sports people 
 Adil Atan (abkhaz surname Twanba) – Olympic bronze medalist in Freestyle wrestling in 1952.
 Haydar Zafer – World champion in Freestyle wrestling in 1951.
 Gündüz Kılıç – football player and coach. Champion of Turkey with Galatasaray SK like a football player in 1938-1939, and manager in 1954-1955 and 1955-1956.
 Altay Bayındır (abkhaz surname Agrba) – professional footballer who plays as goalkeeper im Fenerbahçe S.K. 
 Tayfur Havutçu (abkhaz surname Marshan) –  international football manager and former player who was most recently the manager of Süper Lig club Kasımpaşa.
 Orkan Çınar - footballer who plays as a winger for MKE Ankaragücü.
 Süleyman Seba (abkhaz surname Tsiba) - the longest presiding Chairman of the Istanbul based multisports club Beşiktaş J.K.

Other 
 Muhammed Tokcan - leader of the terrorist group "Shamil's Grandsons".

See also
 Abkhazia–Turkey relations
 Turks in Abkhazia

References

Demographics of Turkey
Turkish people of Abkhazian descent
European diaspora in Turkey